The 1995 Triple J Hottest 100, counted down in January 1996, was a countdown of the most popular songs of the year, according to listeners of the Australian radio station Triple J. A CD featuring 32 of the songs was released. A countdown of the videos of most of the songs was also shown on the ABC music series Rage.

Full list

Artists with multiple entries
Three entries
TISM (9, 10, 93)
Red Hot Chili Peppers (20, 28, 75)
Live (22, 34, 71)
You Am I (24, 84, 94)
Alanis Morissette (39, 85, 90)
Green Day (46, 80, 99)
Two entries
Oasis (1, 13)
The Presidents of the United States of America (4, 11)
Björk (5, 83)
Jeff Buckley (14, 89)
Garbage (15, 21)
Jill Sobule (18, 59)
Faith No More (29, 91)
Pearl Jam (35, 44)
Foo Fighters (37, 70)
Pollyanna (58, 68)
U2 (Once with Brian Eno as Passengers, and once as U2) (23, 57)

Countries represented
 United States – 44
 Australia – 30
 United Kingdom – 16
 Canada – 5
 Iceland – 2
 Ireland – 2 
 Jamaica – 1
 New Zealand – 1

CD release

Certifications

See also
1995 in music

1995
1995 in Australian music
1995 record charts